Sir William Henry Rattigan, KC (4 September 1842 – 4 July 1904) was a British judge and Liberal Unionist MP for North East Lanarkshire.

Background and education
Rattigan was born in Delhi, India, in September 1842, the son of Bartholomew Rattigan, of Athy, Co. Kildare. He was educated at the High School, Agra, and King's College London, and was admitted to bar as a member of Lincoln's Inn in 1873.  He later received a doctorate (LL.D) from the University of Göttingen.

Legal and political career
Most of his legal career took place in India. He served as judge in the Chief Court of the Punjab on four occasions, was knighted in 1895, took silk in 1897 and practiced in the High court of the North Western Provinces. He was also an additional member of the supreme legislative council of India 1892–93, and member of the Punjab legislative council 1898–99.

In 1887 he was Vice-Chancellor of Punjab University, from which he later received an honorary doctorate (LL.D). An honorary doctorate (LL.D) from the University of Glasgow followed in June 1901.

After moving back to the United Kingdom, Rattigan contested the North East Lanarkshire constituency in the general election 1900, but lost to the incumbent, John Colville. When the latter died the following year, Rattigan contested and won a by-election in for the same constituency in September 1901, and held it until his death in London three years later.

Rattigan died in a motor accident on 4 July 1904.

Family
Rattigan married, in 1878, Evelyn Higgins, daughter of Colonel A. Higgins, CIE. His son Sir Henry Adolphus Rattigan later achieved note as the Chief Justice of the Lahore High Court, while his youngest son Cyril Stanley Rattigan played first-class cricket and was killed in action during the First World War.

Publications
The Roman Law of Persons, 1873
The Science of Jurisprudence, 1892
Private International Law, 1895
Digest of Customary Law for Punjab, 1895

Notes

References 
 This source gives his date of death as 1905.

External links 
 
 

1842 births
1904 deaths
Alumni of King's College London
Members of the Parliament of the United Kingdom for Scottish constituencies
UK MPs 1900–1906
Liberal Unionist Party MPs for Scottish constituencies
Vice-Chancellors of the University of the Punjab
British King's Counsel
Road incident deaths in the United Kingdom